"Love's Made a Fool of You" is a song co-written and originally performed by Buddy Holly. It was later re-recorded by Sonny Curtis and the Crickets, with the lead vocal by Earl Sinks, and famously covered by the Bobby Fuller Four.

Buddy Holly first wrote the song in 1954. It was not until 1958 that it was recorded, as an Everly Brothers demo, which was not released until 1964 on the posthumous Showcase LP. The first public release of "Love's Made a Fool of You", however, was by the Crickets, headed by Sonny Curtis in 1959. It was released as a single from In Style with the Crickets, and stayed on the UK Singles Chart for two weeks, peaking at number 26. The Crickets' version, without Holly, was accidentally included on the 1972 compilation album Buddy Holly: A Rock and Roll Collection; the same mistake was made on 1997's The Very Best of Buddy Holly.

Charts

Bobby Fuller Four version

The Bobby Fuller Four released a version of the song in 1966, and it became one of the group's most famous songs. It was another Crickets cover, to follow their smash-hit "I Fought the Law". It broke the Top 30, and was also performed live on Hollywood A Go-Go. This recording features Dalton Powell on drums, taking over from longtime drummer, DeWayne Quirico.

Personnel
Bobby Fuller - guitar, vocals
Randy Fuller (musician) - bass, backing vocals
Jim Reese (musician) - guitar, backing vocals
Dalton Powell - drums

Charts

Other versions
Bobby Vee released a cover of Holly's version in 1961.

Tom Rush recorded a cover of the song for his 1966 album, Take a Little Walk With Me.

The band Cochise covers the song on their 1971 album, Swallow Tales.

A Greg Kihn version appears on the 1977 album, Greg Kihn Again (Beserkley Records).

A Chris Spedding version appears on the 1986 album, Enemy Within.

A Carla Olson/James Intveld version of this song appears on the 2013 Carla album, Have Harmony, Will Travel.

References

1954 songs
1959 singles
1966 singles
Buddy Holly songs
Songs written by Buddy Holly
Songs written by Bob Montgomery (songwriter)
Brunswick Records singles
The Crickets songs